Alexander Balankin (born March 3, 1958) is a Mexican scientist of Russian origin (Баланкин, Александр Сергеевич) whose work in the field of fractal mechanics and its engineering applications won him the UNESCO Science Prize in 2005.

Currently he is a professor of physics at the National Polytechnic Institute of Mexico, Head of the Fractal Mechanics Group, and since 2003, a member of the Science Consulting Council of the Presidency of the Republic, Mexico.

Biography

Early life and education
Alexander Balankin was born in Moscow, Soviet Union. He graduated from Moscow Engineering Physics Institute in 1981. He holds a Philosophy Doctorate in Physics and Mathematics from Moscow Engineering Physics Institute (1986). Five years after that, the Higher Attestation Commission (USSR) awarded him a Doctor of Science degree. In this period, he was also honoured with the state prize of the Russian Ministry of Defense (1990) and a prize from the Academy of Sciences of the USSR in 1991. In addition he has served as Member of the Council of the Union (former-USSR) for the Physics of Materials Resistance and Fracture (Russia, 1991–92). In 1992, Professor Balankin immigrated to Mexico and in 2000 became a Mexican citizen.

Career in Mexico

In 1997 Professor Balankin joined the Department of Electromechanical Engineering at the National Polytechnic Institute (IPN), after holding a position as full professor in the Monterrey Institute of Technology and Higher Education at Mexico City from 1992 to 1997. He also serves as an Adviser of the Mexican Institute of Petroleum and the Mexican Transport Institute and as a Consultant of the Mexican National Petroleum Company (PEMEX).

Since 2003 Professor Balankin is a Counselor of the Science Consulting Council of the President's Office, Mexico.  He is a National Researcher of the highest level from the National System of Researchers and member of the Mexican Academy of Sciences. He has also held a number of other prestigious positions in Mexico, among them as a Counselor of the Membership Committee of the National System of Researchers (1999–2003) and as the Chairman of the Fracture Mechanics Symposium at the Annual International Materials Research Congress (1998–2009).

In 1998 Professor Balankin founded a National Interdisciplinary Research Group Fractal Mechanics as a joint venture between industry and university. He also created a laboratory of Fracture Mechanics at the National Polytechnic Institute and the Interuniversity Laboratory Fractal analysis of Complex Systems. Professor Balankin is also a great teacher who is involved in the education of a new generation of scholars. He has directed 19 PhD dissertations and 18 MS theses many of which were recognized as the best at the National level.

Scientific and technological achievements
Professor Balankin has done pioneering work in fractal solid mechanics, probabilistic fracture mechanics, and fluid flow through porous media. Specifically, he has developed the probabilistic mechanics of self-affine cracks, a new theory which permits one to increment the reliability of probabilistic fracture mechanics analysis. 
Balankin also has introduced the new concept of multifractal elasticity and has developed the theory of mechanical behaviour and fracture of composites with multifractal structures. In 1996, the development of new composite materials with multifractal microstructure, supervised by Professor Balankin, was recognized with the First Place Romulo Garza Prize for Research and Technological Development in Mexico in 1996.

Further, he has discovered new important general features in dynamics of self-affine interfaces growing far from equilibrium: a new type of unconventional anomalous roughening dynamics of flame fronts in heterogeneous media, self-affine fluctuations of growing interface width, non-universal nature of interface roughness dynamics in systems with long-range spatial and temporal correlations, a new statistical distribution function for interface roughness statistics, relationships between structural, mechanical, and dynamical properties of an elastic fractal networks, fractal kinetics of self-organization of dissipative structures in the process of mechanical alloying in attritors, fractal morphology of sol-gels materials, fractal scattering of radar microwaves from soils. He has also suggested some modifications to the fracture toughness testing standards, concerning the effect of fractal crack roughness and has proposed a new criterion for crack initiation – the fractal fracture toughness, the revolutionary concept which is actually used in the probabilistic integrity assessment of oil pipelines.

From 2001, Professor Balankin has also been involved in an ambitious project of fractal study of soils, which is expected to introduce revolutionary changes in the agriculture technology that will provide great benefits to Mexico and to developing countries. The works in this field have received a great international projection. More recently, Professor Balankin has developed a novel dynamic scaling approach to study and forecast time series fluctuations. This finding permits us to use the powerful tools of kinetic roughening theory to classify, model, and forecast the fluctuations of real-world time series. In particular, dynamic scaling approach was used in the Econophysics studies performed by the Fractal Mechanics group, in which it was discovered some important features in the oil market behaviour that permit the better forecasting of crude oil prices.

The last work was awarded in 2004 with the National Prize in Financial Research. At the same time, Professor Balankin actively pursued research opportunities in engineering probabilistic fracture mechanics. Besides, he has made a principal contribution to the development of a new risk based maintenance program for nuclear reactor vessel of the Laguna Verde nuclear power plant. The cost-benefit analysis of the suggested risk-based inspection program has shown that this program represents a substantial saving in cost and reduces the radiation exposure during the nuclear plant operation. It is important to mention, the risk-informed in-service inspection program increases vessel safety, because it focuses on any potential additional examinations on those areas which are most likely to experience the probable failure conditions. This work was recognized as the best research project in applied sciences in 2001 and has been honoured with the First Place Prize for the Research in 2001 by the National Polytechnic Institute.

More recently, Professor Balankin has developed a new methodology of probabilistic reliability assignment of cable-stayed bridges, actually used by the Mexican Transport Institute. He has also developed the methodology and software for probabilistic evaluation of oil pipelines. The proposed risk-based pipeline assessment procedure is more reliable to account for huge amount of collected data usually obtained in in-service inspections using the intelligent devices. The outcomes of developed risk-based methodology are very useful in the decision-making process by the operation management. Now, this methodology is used by the (PEMEX) and saves the Mexican Government millions of dollars each year by preventing pipeline accidents. Another of his technological contributions is the development of models and simulators of new revolutionary methods of oil extraction from naturally fractured reservoirs which will permit the increment the crude extraction from such reservoirs up to 100%.

Recent projects

Honors and awards
Professor Balankin has been the recipient of many other awards and honours, including the highest honour awarded in Mexico, the National Prize for Arts and Sciences in the area Technology and Design in 2002 and the UNESCO Science Prize in 2005, for his remarkable ability to relate his research in fractal mechanics to technological applications that has provided great benefits to Mexico and worldwide. In 2005 
President of Mexico has honoured the Professor Balankin with the Lazaro Cardenas’ Gold Medal (Presea Lázaro Cárdenas). In 2009 Alexander Balankin was awards by the Juchimán de Plata Award (Mexico).

References

External links
 Biography at Science Consulting Council of the Presidency of the Republic
 Boletín de la Sociedad Mexicana de Física
  from Mexican Academy of Sciences
 Balankin´s homepage at the Fractal Mechanics Group homepage
 Alexander Balankin
 Баланкин, Александр Сергеевич

Publications
Professor Balankin has published more than 120 articles in scientific journals and 5 books. He also held 6 patents.

Books

Selected papers
 
 
 
 
 
 
 
 
 
 
 
 
 
 
 
 
 
 
 
 
 
 
 

1958 births
Living people
Russian emigrants to Mexico
UNESCO Science Prize laureates
21st-century Mexican physicists
Mexican mechanical engineers
Academic staff of the Instituto Politécnico Nacional
Scientists from Mexico City
Members of the Mexican Academy of Sciences
Soviet physicists
Soviet mechanical engineers
20th-century Mexican engineers